The Stjarnan women's basketball team, commonly known as Stjarnan, is the women's basketball department of Ungmennafélagið Stjarnan, based in the town of Garðabær, Iceland.

History
In 2009, disgruntled Ármann players, unhappy with poor training facilities and lack of practice time, contacted Stjarnan and inquired if the board would be interested in starting a women's team. The board responded positively and in the end the entire Ármann team transferred over.

Stjarnan finished first in the second-tier 1. deild kvenna in 2015 and defeated Njarðvík in the playoffs to win promotion to the top-tier Úrvalsdeild kvenna for the first time in its history.

After a disappointing first season, where high scoring guard Chelsie Schweers was fired mid-season and head coach Baldur Ingi Jónasson resigned before the seasons end, Stjarnan bounced back in 2016-2017 behind Danielle Rodriguez stellar play and made it to the playoffs. They were beaten 3-0 by Snæfell in the semi-finals.

On 13 February 2019, behind Rodriguez 33 points, including a three-point heave from just inside the half-court line to finish the first half, Stjarnan's won Breiðablik, 103–82, in the Icelandic Cup semi-finals, advancing to the Cup finals for the first time in its history.

On June 7, 2019, the board of Stjarnan withdrew the team from the Úrvalsdeild for the upcoming season and registered for the second-tier 1. deild kvenna, stating that it was necessary after several of its starters had left the team. On 22 August it was reported that the board had withdrawn the team from the 1. deild kvenna after it delayed hiring a new head coach. A spokesperson for the board stated that it did not want to field a team that relied to much on non-homegrown players. The club was criticized for its actions in withdrawing the team, including by former player Ragna Margrét Brynjarsdóttir, especially since the argument of homegrown players did not apply to its men's team where the vast majority of players did not come up through Stjarnan's youth program.

Season by season

Trophies and awards

Trophies
 1. deild kvenna (2):
2011, 2023

Awards
Úrvalsdeild Women's Domestic All-First Team
 Ragna Margrét Brynjarsdóttir – 2017

Úrvalsdeild Women's Foreign Player of the Year
 Danielle Rodriguez – 2018

Úrvalsdeild Women's Defensive Player of the Year
 Auður Íris Ólafsdóttir – 2019

Notable players

Coaches

References

External links
Official Website  
Eurobasket team profile
KKÍ: Stjarnan – kki.is  

Stjarnan (basketball)